During the 1995–96 English football season, West Bromwich Albion competed in the Football League First Division.

Season summary
The 1995–96 season was a highly inconsistent one for the club. In October 1995, they were second and hopeful of automatic promotion, but then came a drastic loss of form which, in a fourteen match run, saw them lose 13 games, draw one and win none. They looked set to be relegated to Division Two, but a marked improvement in form during the final four months of the season saw them climb to mid table. Later during the season, the club signed Richard Sneekes from Bolton Wanderers. He would prove an instant hit, scoring ten league goals in less than half a season, and a cult figure with the fans.

Final league table

Results
West Bromwich Albion's score comes first

Legend

Football League First Division

FA Cup

League Cup

First-team squad
Squad at end of season

Left club during season

Notes

References

West Bromwich Albion F.C. seasons
West Bromwich Albion